Mordellistena parvuliformis is a species of beetle in the genus Mordellistena of the family Mordellidae. It was described by Stshegoleva-Barovskaya in 1930.

References

Beetles described in 1930
parvuliformis